Amar Ghoul (born 21 February 1961) is an Algerian politician and a former transport minister in the Algerian government.

Biography 
Amar Ghoul was born in the wilaya of Ain Defla. He obtained his bac in maths at school in Miliana in 1980. In 1986, he took the post of engineer of State Civil Engineering in à Rouiba (ع ن). He continued his studies and obtained a DEA in nuclear engineering. In 1989, he left for France and in 1991 obtained a Doctorate in nuclear engineering. In 1998, he gained a diploma from Oran where he became a Doctor of State Mechanical Engineering.

In the political field, he was elected in 1997 as an MP to the Assemblée populaire nationale for the MSP. He quickly became chairman of the parliamentary group.

See also
Cabinet of Algeria

References

Members of the People's National Assembly
1961 births
Living people
Movement of Society for Peace politicians
Government ministers of Algeria
21st-century Algerian people